Alaris is a regional rail network run by the Spanish national rail company Renfe Operadora.

Alaris may also refer to:

Business
 Kodak Alaris, a manufacturer and marketer of traditional photographic supplies
 A line of medical infusion pumps produced by BD
 A brand of 3D desktop printer from Objet Geometries

Fiction
 Alaris (comics), a Marvel Comics character
 EverQuest: Veil of Alaris, an expansion of the EverQuest online role-playing game
 Alaris Prime, a plot element in the Star Wars: Galactic Battlegrounds video game

Other
 A grammatical form of alar, as in Alar cartilages
 Euthycera alaris, a species of fly
 Gallicolumba rufigula alaris, a subspecies of the Cinnamon ground dove